The Centro sperimentale di cinematografia (Experimental Film Centre or Italian National film school) was established in 1935 in Italy and aims to promote the art and technique of cinematography and film.

The centre is the oldest film school in Western Europe, founded in the city of Rome in 1935 during the Benito Mussolini era by his head of cinema Luigi Freddi. It was and still is financed by the Italian government and focuses on education, research, publication, and theory.

Function
Among the centre's goals are the development of cinema and audio-visual art and techniques to levels of excellence through distinct sectors of the Foundation itself, the National Film School, and the National Film Archive.

The National Film School has its main headquarters in Rome, with triennial courses in acting, screenplay writing, production design, set design, as well as costuming, cinematography, sound engineering, production, and editing. It is a full member of the international CILECT network of film schools.

History
During World War II, much of the original production equipment was stolen or destroyed by the Nazi occupiers. Many attempts to trace them in Germany and the Soviet Union after the war were unsuccessful.

Facilities
Located near Cinecittà, the school trains its students using 35mm equipment over a 3-year period. With only 6 places available per class, selection is highly competitive.

The school's mentors include Piero Tosi (costumes), Giuseppe Rotunno (photography), and Giancarlo Giannini (acting).

Alumni include:

Directors

 Michelangelo Antonioni
 Giuseppe De Santis
 Luigi Zampa
 Pietro Germi
 Francesco Maselli
 Nanni Loy
 Folco Quilici
 Christian Filippella
 Domenico Distilo
 Lucio Fulci
 Emidio Greco
 Carlo Verdone
 Francesca Archibugi
 Liliana Cavani
 Umberto Lenzi
 Silvano Agosti
 Marco Bellocchio
 Roberto Faenza
 Fausto Brizzi
 Yasuzo Masumura
 Salvatore Mereu
 Gabriele Muccino
 Giuseppe Petitto
 Susanna Nicchiarelli
 Eros Puglielli
 Sergio Sollima
 Roberta Torre
 Paolo Virzì
 Veljko Bulajic
 Margaret Tait

Actors

 Giorgio Albertazzi
 Maria Pia Calzone
 Claudia Cardinale
 Andrea Checchi
 Carla Del Poggio
 Babak Karimi
 Sophia Loren
 Enrico Lo Verso
 Domenico Modugno
 Giovanni Morassutti
 Francesca Neri
 Lorenzo Richelmy
 Simona Tabasco
 Alida Valli

Cinematographers
 Nestor Almendros
 Philo Bregstein
 Pasqualino De Santis
 Vittorio Storaro

Costume Designers
 Daniela Ciancio
 Anina Pinter

References

External links
 
 

 
Film schools in Italy
Mass media in Rome
Drama schools in Italy